Nguyễn Xuân Nam (born 18 January 1994) is a Vietnamese footballer who plays as a forward for V.League 1 club Công An Hà Nội, having previously played for Lao Premier League club SHB Vientiane F.C. and V.League 1 club Sài Gòn, both on loan from Hà Nội.

International goals

U-16

U-19

Honours
 AFF U-19 Youth Championship top scorer: 2011
 V.League 2 top scorer: 2019

References

1994 births
Living people
Vietnamese footballers
Association football forwards
People from Hải Dương province
Expatriate footballers in Laos
Vietnamese expatriate footballers
Vietnamese expatriate sportspeople in Laos
Hanoi FC players
V.League 1 players